Joseph Fürst (13 February 1916 – 29 November 2005) was an Austrian-born international film and television actor known for his English language roles in Britain and Australia, after first appearing on the Canadian stage.

Career 
Fürst was regularly featured in UK television drama series of the 1960s and early 1970s with appearances in The Saint, The Champions, Doomwatch, The Persuaders!, and as the mad (and well remembered) Professor Zaroff in the Doctor Who story The Underwater Menace. Many people believe his accent in this role to have been put on; this is incorrect, it was in fact his real accent. He also played the role of Schneider in the Armchair Theatre play "A Magnum for Schneider", which launched Edward Woodward as the character of Callan. (The play led to the highly regarded Callan TV series.)

Fürst's notable film appearances included 55 Days at Peking (1963), The Brides of Fu Manchu (1966), the James Bond movie Diamonds Are Forever (1971) as Dr Metz, and Inn of the Damned (1975).

He emigrated to Australia and, starting in the mid-1970s, acted in several guest roles on Australian television drama series. They included several appearances in the top-rated police drama Division 4, produced by Crawford Productions in the 1970s. He played an ongoing role in soap opera Number 96 in 1976 as deli owner Carlo Lenzi, who was introduced to the series as a new Italian family alongside Arianthe Galani and Harry Michaels, his character romanced wine bar proprietor Norma Whittaker (Sheila Kennelly). He also played Heinrik Smeaton in The Young Doctors in 1979, and was a guest on situation comedy  Kingswood Country, again opposite Kennelly. He guest starred in four episodes of A Country Practice in the early 1980s. In 1984, he starred in the ABC TV film The Schippan Mystery.

Shortly before his death, Fürst was interviewed by Dwayne Bunney and Dallas Jones for "Loose Cannon" and spoke about his career. The interview was an extra feature in the reconstruction of the missing Doctor Who story "The Underwater Menace".

Filmography

References

External links

1916 births
2005 deaths
Austrian male film actors
Austrian male television actors
Male actors from Vienna
Austrian emigrants to Australia
Austrian expatriates in Canada
Austrian expatriates in the United Kingdom